Päite Landscape Conservation Area is a nature park which is located in Ida-Viru County, Estonia.

The area of the nature park is 129 ha.

The protected area was founded in 2005 to protect the landscapes and biodiversity of Toila Parish (including Päite village).

References

Nature reserves in Estonia
Geography of Ida-Viru County